Calathus metallicus is a species of ground beetle from the Platyninae subfamily that can be found in Albania, Bulgaria, Greece, Poland, Romania, Slovakia, Ukraine, all states of former Yugoslavia (except Slovenia), and Near East.

References

metallicus
Beetles described in 1802
Beetles of Europe